The India women's national cricket team toured Australia in January 2016 together with the Indian men cricket team. The tour included a series of three ODIs and three T20Is. The ODIs were part of the ICC Women's Championship.

Squads

Tour match

T20I series

1st T20I

2nd T20I

3rd T20I

ODI Series

1st ODI

2nd ODI

3rd ODI

References

External links 
 Series home at ESPN Cricinfo

International cricket competitions in 2015–16
2014–16 ICC Women's Championship
India 2015-16
Australia 2015-16
2015–16 Indian women's cricket
2015–16 Australian women's cricket season
2016 in women's cricket
January 2016 sports events in Australia